Darwesh is a village and one of the 44 union councils, administrative subdivisions, of Haripur District in the Khyber Pakhtunkhwa province of Pakistan. It is located south of the district capital, Haripur, at 33°59'26N 72°55'5E.

Darwesh village is home to a branch of the famous Tareen family of Hazara region, The best-known member of this is ex-Speaker of the NWFP (KPK) Assembly, Major (retd) Habibullah Khan Tarin.

References 

Union councils of Haripur District